Like You Do may refer to:

Like You Do... Best of The Lightning Seeds, 1997 greatest hits album by the Lightning Seeds
"Like You Do", song by REO Speedwagon from the album R.E.O./T.W.O., 1972
"Like You Do", song by the Lightning Seeds from the album Dizzy Heights, 1996 
"Like You Do", song by Joji from the album Nectar, 2020